Allied Filmmakers was a British film production company, founded by Jake Eberts in London in 1985 as a film branch from Pathé.

Production filmography 
Hope and Glory (1987; uncredited)
The Adventures of Baron Munchausen (1988)
Last Exit to Brooklyn (1989)
Driving Miss Daisy (1989; uncredited)
Dances with Wolves (1990)
The Nutcracker Prince (1990)
Dragon and Slippers (1991; uncredited)
Get Back (1991; music documentary of The Paul McCartney World Tour)
City of Joy (1992)
The Magic Voyage (1992; uncredited)
A River Runs Through It (1992)
Super Mario Bros. (1993)
The Thief and the Cobbler (1993)
No Escape (1994; as Escape from Absolom in countries)
James and the Giant Peach (1996)
The Wind in the Willows (1996; a.k.a. Mr. Toad's Wild Ride in the United States)
Grey Owl (1999)
Chicken Run (2000; uncredited)
The Legend of Bagger Vance (2000)
Renaissance (2006; uncredited)
The Illusionist (2010; uncredited)

See also 
About Jake Eberts in movies.yahoo.com.

Film production companies of the United Kingdom
Mass media companies established in 1985
British companies established in 1985
1985 establishments in the United Kingdom